Anik Matern is founder and president of the Dynamic Theater Factory.

References

External links
 
 Dynamic Theater Factory

Living people
Year of birth missing (living people)